The Changqi Cup, or Chang-ki Cup, is a Go competition in China.

Outline 
The Changqi Cup is a Go tournament held by the Zhongguo Qiyuan dedicated to Ing Chang-ki. It began every year on Ing's birthday, October 23 and ended in the spring of the following year. Starting in 2008, the tournament began in May and ended in October. 

Players compete in a preliminary tournament to qualify. After the preliminaries, 30 players compete in a single elimination tournament, with the previous year's finalists being directly seeded to the second round. The semifinals and final are a best-of-three match. The Changqi Cup is one of the few professional tournaments to use Ing rules. The winner receives 450,000 in prize money, and the runner-up receives 150,000.

Past winners and runners-up

References

Changqi Cup
2004 introductions